The Romeo Section is a Canadian spy thriller television series created and written by Chris Haddock which debuted on October 14, 2015, on CBC Television. CBC renewed the series for a second season which began airing on October 5, 2016. The series ran for two seasons.

Seasons

Season 1
The series follows spymaster Professor Wolfgang McGee, an academic who secretly manages a roster of espionage assets. These assets, referred to as Romeo or Juliet spies, are informants engaged in intimate relations with intelligence targets. Wolfgang himself is a semi-retired Romeo operator, having worked his way up in an officially deniable "service" under the umbrella of Canada's intelligence community. Based in Vancouver, British Columbia, the Romeo and Juliet recruits infiltrate the city’s heroin trade and keep eyes on an asylum seeker, while their handler searches for the elusive faction leader of the Red Mountain Triad.

Season 2
In the Le Carré-esque second season, the master of espionage, Wolfgang McGee, steps away from his role of asset handler to investigate an attempted bombing in Vancouver. The case comes to Wolfgang through Harry, a shadowy government figure, who presents the theory that the attack could have been a false flag operation. For help, Wolfgang calls upon an old acquaintance, a black-balled spy named Norman. Together they review the chain of events surrounding the attack to uncover massive holes and blunders, either made by human error or deliberately, as sabotage. To find out which, the two spies investigate the mystery.

Meanwhile, separated from Wolfgang, former assets Rufus and Lily use their Romeo skills to seduce their way up the ladder in the heroin trade and espionage circles.

Cast
 Andrew Airlie as Wolfgang McGee (often going by the name Rupert Holmby for his undercover work)
 Juan Riedinger as Rufus Decker
 Eugene Lipinski as Al Crenshaw (often going by the name Bill West for his undercover work)
 Fei Ren as Mei Mei
 Ian Tracey as Fergie
 Jemmy Chen as Lily Song (season 1)
 Stephanie Bennett as Dee (season 1)
 Matt Bellefleur as Vince Taggart (season 1)
 Manny Jacinto as Wing Lei (season 1)
 Sophia Lauchlin Hirt as Eva Walker (season 1)
 Mathias Retamal as Miguel Padilla (season 1)
 Leeah Wong as Lily Song (season 2) 
 Brian Markinson as Norman (season 2)
 Jorge Montesi as Harry (season 2)

Episodes

Season 1 (2015)

Season 2 (2016)

References

External links
 
 

2015 Canadian television series debuts
2016 Canadian television series endings
2010s Canadian drama television series
CBC Television original programming
Espionage television series
Television shows filmed in Vancouver
Television shows set in Vancouver
Canadian thriller television series
Triad (organized crime)